CAMP STAG are a 7-piece alternative rock band, formed in 2011 in Stoke-on-Trent, England. Their debut single 'Sirens', which they self-released on 16 April 2012, received national airplay courtesy of BBC Introducing on BBC Radio 1, BBC 6 Music, and XFM, as well as featuring on BBC TV's Newsround. As a result, the band were one of two acts based in Stoke-on-Trent to be invited to perform on the BBC Introducing Stage at Glastonbury Festival on Saturday 28 June 2013.

They released an EP entitled 'When The Lights Come Down' on 21 October 2012, and a second single, 'Walking With Broken Bones' on 27 May 2013. During the summer of 2013, they appeared at Glastonbury Festival, Sheffield Tramlines Festival, Kendal Calling, and Belladrum Tartan Heart Festival.

The band released their second EP 'Leviathan' on 26 September 2014, and lead track 'Paper Houses' was chosen by Simon Raymonde as his "Track of the Week" on his Amazing Radio show.

Their debut album, 'Tremolo', was due for release in 2020, but was postponed due to the COVID-19 pandemic. It was finally released on 16 April 2021 via their own Northern Dream label.

Discography

Singles 

 Sirens (2012)
 Walking With Broken Bones (2013)
 Hide & Seek (2014)
 Glory! (2015)
 Cold Vision (Northern Dream, 2017)

EPs 

 When The Lights Come Down (2012)
 Leviathan (2014)
 Science Fiction (Northern Dream, 2016)

Albums 

 Tremolo (Northern Dream, 2021)

Line up 

 Emily Andrews (vocals)
 Rich Dooley (guitar, synthesiser)
 Ade Harrison (keys)
 Tomos Hughes (drums)
 Dan Nixon (vocals, guitar)
 Alex Shenton (guitar)
 Chris Wilson (bass guitar)

References

Musical groups established in 2011
English indie rock groups
Musical groups from Staffordshire
Music in Stoke-on-Trent
2011 establishments in England